This is a list of instruments by Hornbostel-Sachs number, covering those instruments that are classified under 31 under that system. This category includes all instruments consisting of a simple string bearer and strings. An additional resonator may be present, but it is not integral, so removing it should not destroy the instrument - the resonator must not be supporting the strings.

This category includes musical bows, zithers and some keyboard instruments like the piano and harpsichord.

These instruments may be classified with a suffix, based on how the strings are caused to vibrate.

4: Hammers or beaters
5: Bare hands and fingers
6: Plectrum
7: Bowing
71: Using a bow
72: Using a wheel
73: Using a ribbon
8: Keyboard
9: Using a mechanical drive

List

Clavichord
Harpsichord
Musical bow
Carimba
Piano
Zither
Gayageum
Overtone zither
Aeolian harp
Koto
Cymbalum
Hammered dulcimer

References

31